Kenneth Wayne Dryden  (born August 8, 1947) is a Canadian politician, lawyer, businessman, author, and former National Hockey League (NHL) goaltender. He is an Officer of the Order of Canada and a member of the Hockey Hall of Fame. He was a Liberal Member of Parliament from 2004 to 2011 and Minister of Social Development from 2004 to 2006. In 2017, the league counted him in history's 100 Greatest NHL Players. He received the Order of Hockey in Canada in 2020.

Early life and education
Dryden was born in Hamilton, Ontario, in 1947. His parents were Murray Dryden (1911–2004) and Margaret Adelia Campbell (1912-1985). He has a sister, Judy, and a brother, Dave, who was also an NHL goaltender. Dryden was raised in Islington, Ontario, then a suburb of Toronto. He played with the Etobicoke Indians of the Metro Junior B Hockey League as well as Humber Valley Packers of the Metro Toronto Hockey League.

Dryden was drafted fourteenth overall by the Boston Bruins in the 1964 NHL Amateur Draft. Days later, June 28, Boston traded Dryden, along with Alex Campbell, to the Montreal Canadiens for Paul Reid and Guy Allen. Dryden was told by his agent that he had been drafted by the Canadiens and did not find out until the mid-1970s that he had been drafted by the Bruins.

Rather than play for the Canadiens in 1964, Dryden pursued a B.A. degree in History at Cornell University, where he also played hockey until his graduation in 1969. He backstopped the Cornell Big Red to the 1967 National Collegiate Athletic Association championship and to three consecutive ECAC tournament championships, and won 76 of his 81 varsity starts. At Cornell, he was a member of the Quill and Dagger society. He also was a member of the Canadian amateur national team at the 1969 World Ice Hockey Championships tournament in Stockholm.

Dryden took a break from the NHL for the 1973–74 season to article for a Toronto law firm, and to earn an LL.B. degree he received from McGill University in 1973. During this time Dryden interned with Ralph Nader's Public Citizen organization. Inspired by Nader's call in Action for a Change for establishing Public Interest Research Group's, Dryden tried to establish the Ontario Public Interest Research Group in the Province of Ontario.

Dryden's jersey number 1 was retired by the Cornell Big Red on February 25, 2010; along with Joe Nieuwendyk, he is one of only two players to have their numbers retired by Cornell's hockey program.

Playing career
Dryden made his NHL debut on Sunday March 14, 1971 against the Pittsburgh Penguins in Pittsburgh. The Canadiens won the game 5-1, and the only goal scored against Ken was by a player named John Stewart. Later, on March 20, 1971, in a home game against his brother Dave Dryden, a fellow backup goaltender for Buffalo Sabres, when Canadiens starter Rogie Vachon suffered an injury; this still stands, as of 2021, as the only time a pair of brothers faced against each other as goaltenders. He was called up from the minors late in the season and played only six regular-season games, but rang up an impressive 1.65 goals-against average. This earned him the starting goaltending job for the playoffs ahead of veteran Rogie Vachon, and he helped the Canadiens to win the Stanley Cup. He also won the Conn Smythe Trophy as the most valuable player in the playoffs.  He helped the Habs win five more Stanley Cups in 1973, 1976, 1977, 1978, and 1979.

The following year Dryden won the Calder Trophy as the rookie of the year; he was not eligible for it the previous year because he did not play enough regular-season games. He is the only player to win the Conn Smythe Trophy before winning the rookie of the year award, and the only goaltender to win both the Conn Smythe and the Stanley Cup before losing a regular-season game. In the autumn of 1972 Dryden played for Team Canada in the 1972 Summit Series against the Soviet national ice hockey team.

Dryden played from 1971 to 1979, with a break during the entire 1973–74 season; he was unhappy with the contract that the Canadiens offered him, which he considered less than his market worth, given that he had won the Stanley Cup and Vezina Trophy. He announced on September 14, 1973, that he was joining the Toronto law firm of Osler, Hoskin and Harcourt as a legal clerk for the year, for $135 a week. He skipped training camp and held out that season. The Canadiens still had a good year, going 45-24-9, but lost in the first round of the playoffs to the New York Rangers in six games. The Canadiens allowed 56 more goals in the 1973–74 season than they had the year before with Dryden. Dryden used that year to fulfill the requirements for his law degree at McGill and article for a law firm. He retired for the last time on July 9, 1979.

Compared to those of most other great hockey players, Dryden's NHL career was very short: just over seven full seasons. Thus he did not amass record totals in most statistical categories. As he played all his years with a dynasty and retired before he passed his prime, his statistical percentages are unparalleled. His regular-season totals include a 74.3 winning percentage, a 2.24 goals-against average, a 92.2 save percentage, 46 shutouts, and 258 wins, only 57 losses and 74 ties in just 397 NHL games. He won the Vezina Trophy five times as the goaltender on the team who allowed the fewest goals and in the same years was selected as a First Team All-Star. In 1998, he was ranked number 25 on The Hockey News list of the 100 Greatest Hockey Players, a remarkable achievement for a player with a comparatively brief career.

At 6 feet, 4 inches, Dryden was so tall that during stoppages in play he struck what became his trademark pose: leaning upon his stick. He was known as the "four-storey goalie," and was once referred to as "that thieving giraffe" by Boston Bruins superstar Phil Esposito, in reference to Dryden's skill and height. Unbeknownst to him, his pose was exactly the same as the one struck by fellow Canadiens goaltender, Georges Vézina, 60 years prior.

Dryden was inducted into the Hockey Hall of Fame in 1983, as soon as he was eligible. His jersey number 29 was retired by the Canadiens on January 29, 2007. He was inducted into the Ontario Sports Hall of Fame in 2011.

Post playing 

Writing
Dryden wrote one book during his hockey career: Face-Off at the Summit. It was a diary about Team Canada in the Canada vs. Soviet Union series of 1972. The book has been out of print for many years.

After retiring from hockey Dryden wrote several more books. The Game was a commercial and critical success, and was nominated for a Governor General's Award in 1983. His next book, Home Game: Hockey and Life in Canada (1990), written with Roy MacGregor, was developed into an award-winning Canadian Broadcasting Corporation six-part documentary series for television. His fourth book was The Moved and the Shaken: The Story of One Man's Life (1993). His fifth book, In School: Our Kids, Our Teachers, Our Classrooms (1995), written with Roy MacGregor, was about Canada’s educational system. Becoming Canada (2010) argued for a new definition of Canada and its unique place in the world.

In 2019, he published Scotty: A Hockey Life Like No Other, his biography of his Canadiens coach Scotty Bowman. Dryden says at the beginning that he needed to write this book,' because 'Scotty had lived a truly unique life. He has experienced almost everything in hockey, up close, for the best part of a century - and his is a life that no on else will live again. It's a life that had to be captured. And it needs to be captured now, because time is moving on.' 

Feeling that Bowman was 'too practical and focused' to be a natural storyteller, Dryden instead asked Bowman to think like a coach and select the 8 greatest teams of all time (but only one per dynasty) and explain what he thought about them, how we coach against them but also what was happening in his life at that time and through that process, Bowman's story would be told.

Commentator
Dryden worked as a television hockey commentator at the 1980, 1984 and 1988 Winter Olympics. He served as a colour commentator with play-by-play man Al Michaels for ABC's coverage of the "Miracle on Ice." Immediately before Mike Eruzione's game-winning goal for the US, Dryden expressed his concern that the team was "depending a little bit too much" on goaltender Jim Craig after Craig had just made "too many good saves."

Sports executive
In 1997, Dryden was hired as president of the Toronto Maple Leafs by minority owner Larry Tanenbaum. Pat Quinn became head coach in 1998, and there were reports that the two men had a frosty relationship. A few months after joining the Leafs, Quinn became general manager, a move thought by some to preempt Dryden from hiring former Canadiens teammate Bob Gainey.

Dryden spoke at the Open Ice Summit in 1999, to discuss improvements needed to ice hockey in Canada. He wanted delegates to accept that progress made at the lower levels and off the ice was important in achieving international results. He was cautious that change would come slowly and be costly, but felt the summit was an important step in making progress. He also urged for the end to persistent abuse of on-ice officials, or Canada would lose 10,000 referees each year. As a result of the summit, Hockey Canada started to educate on the importance of respect for game officials.

On August 29, 2003, with the hiring of John Ferguson, Jr. as general manager, there was a major management shakeup. Majority owner Steve Stavro was bought out by the Ontario Teachers' Pension Plan and he stepped down as chairman in favour of Larry Tanenbaum. Quinn continued as head coach. Dryden's position was abolished, in favour of having both the Leafs' and Raptors' managers reporting directly to MLSE President and CEO Richard Peddie. Dryden was shuffled to the less important role of vice-chairman and given a spot on MLSE's board of directors. This was described by commentators as "sitting outside the loop", as Dryden did not report directly to Leafs ownership. He stayed on until 2004 when he resigned to enter politics.

Teaching
In January 2012, Dryden was appointed a "Special Visitor" at his alma mater McGill University's Institute for the Study of Canada. He taught a Canadian Studies course entitled "Thinking the Future to Make the Future," which focused on issues facing Canada in the future and possible solutions to them.

Political career
Dryden joined the Liberal Party of Canada and ran for the House of Commons in the 2004 federal election.  He was selected by party leader and Prime Minister Paul Martin as a "star candidate" in the Toronto riding of York Centre, then considered a safe Liberal riding.

Dryden was elected by a margin of over 11,000 votes.  He was named to Cabinet as Minister of Social Development. He made headlines on February 16, 2005, as the target of a remark by Conservative Member of Parliament Rona Ambrose who said about Dryden, "working women want to make their own choices, we don't need old white guys telling us what to do." Ambrose made the remarks after Dryden commented on a poll that analyzed child care choices by Canadian families. Dryden won generally favourable reviews for his performance in Cabinet.

Dryden was re-elected in the 2006 federal election, while the Liberals were defeated and Paul Martin resigned the party leadership. Interim party and opposition leader Bill Graham named Dryden to his shadow cabinet as health critic.

Dryden's margin of victory in York Centre dwindled in the 2006 and 2008 elections. In the 2011 federal election, he focused his efforts on his own re-election instead of campaigning for other candidates as he did in the past, and he received a visit from former Prime Minister Jean Chrétien.  Still, Dryden lost his seat to Conservative candidate Mark Adler by nearly 6,000 votes.

Leadership bid

On April 28, 2006, Dryden announced that he would run for the leadership of the Liberal Party of Canada, which would be choosing a successor to Paul Martin at a convention in Montreal on December 2, 2006.

A poll found that Dryden's potential pool of support exceeded that of his opponents, due mainly to his former NHL career. His fundraising fell well below that of top leadership contenders (Michael Ignatieff, Gerard Kennedy, Stéphane Dion and Bob Rae). A variety of media pundits criticized his ponderous speaking style and limited French. Supporters argued that few people were strongly opposed to him and that if he ran he could attract more support on later ballots as a consensus candidate.

At the convention, Dryden came in fifth place on the first ballot with 238 delegates, 4.9% of the vote. On the second ballot, he came in last place with 219 votes (4.7%) and was eliminated. He initially threw his support to Bob Rae, but after Rae was eliminated in the third ballot and released all of his delegates, Dryden endorsed Stéphane Dion, who went on to win the leadership.

According to Elections Canada filings, as of 2013 Dryden's campaign still owed $225,000.

Personal life
Dryden and his wife Lynda have two children and four grandchildren.  He is a first cousin, twice removed, of Murray Murdoch, another former NHL player and a longtime coach of Yale University's hockey team. His brother Dave also played in the NHL as a goalie, from 1961 to 1980.

Bibliography

Non-fiction
Face-Off at the Summit (1973)
The Game (1983)
Home Game: Hockey and Life in Canada (with Roy MacGregor, 1990)
In School: Our Kids, Our Teachers, Our Classrooms (with Roy MacGregor, 1995)
The Moved and the Shaken (1993)
Becoming Canada (2010)
Game Change (2017)
Scotty: A Hockey Life Like No Other (2019)

Awards and honors
Dryden's hockey awards and honours are numerous and include:

Dryden does not have a substantive doctorate, but has received honorary doctoral degrees from several universities, including:

Career statistics

Regular season and playoffs

* Stanley Cup Champion.

International

References

External links

 Ken Dryden biography at hockeygoalies.org - advanced statistics and game logs

How'd They Vote?: Ken Dryden's voting history and quotes

1947 births
Living people
Boston Bruins draft picks
Calder Trophy winners
Canadian ice hockey goaltenders
Canadian non-fiction writers
Canadian people of Scottish descent
Canadian sportsperson-politicians
Conn Smythe Trophy winners
Cornell Big Red men's ice hockey players
Hockey Hall of Fame inductees
Ice hockey people from Toronto
Lawyers in Ontario
Liberal Party of Canada leadership candidates
Liberal Party of Canada MPs
Members of the House of Commons of Canada from Ontario
Members of the King's Privy Council for Canada
Montreal Canadiens players
National Hockey League All-Stars
National Hockey League general managers
National Hockey League players with retired numbers
National Hockey League team presidents
Officers of the Order of Canada
Olympic Games broadcasters
Order of Hockey in Canada recipients
Politicians from Hamilton, Ontario
Politicians from Toronto
Sportspeople from Hamilton, Ontario
Stanley Cup champions
Toronto Maple Leafs executives
Vezina Trophy winners
Writers from Hamilton, Ontario
Writers from Toronto
Members of the 27th Canadian Ministry
McGill University Faculty of Law alumni
NCAA men's ice hockey national champions
Hockey writers
AHCA Division I men's ice hockey All-Americans